Bahareh is an Iranian feminine given name meaning "Someone or something that arises in the spring". 

Bahareh may also refer to several places in Iran:

 Bahareh, Fars
 Bahareh, Hamadan
 Bahareh, Meydavud, Khuzestan Province
 Bahareh, Seydun, Khuzestan Province